This is a list of the longest team winning streaks in Major League Baseball history. Streaks started at the end of one season are carried over into the following season. The lists below include streaks that consist entirely of regular-season games, streaks from the predecessor National Association (1871–1875), streaks of playoff games and World Series games, and streaks that include both regular-season and postseason games.

The National League’s 1916 New York Giants hold the current record of winning 26 games in a row. The longest American League winning streak is 22, by the 2017 Cleveland Indians. 

The longest winning streak consisting only of playoff games stands at 12 consecutive wins, by the 1927, 1928 and 1932 New York Yankees (who swept the World Series all three seasons) and tied by the 1998–99 Yankees. For streaks that have included both regular and postseason games, the 1970 and 1971 Baltimore Orioles hold the top two positions with 17 and 16 consecutive victories, respectively.

According to Major League Baseball's policy on winning streaks, tie games do not end a team's winning streak. The list below includes streaks with ties.

Key

Game streaks

Regular season
This list contains the top 31 streaks consisting entirely of regular-season games.

National Association

1Denotes season in which team won a pennant in the American Association

Postseason
This list contains only the top 10 streaks (including ties) consisting entirely of postseason games.

World Series
This list contains only the top 10 streaks consisting entirely of World Series games.

Regular season and postseason
This list contains only the top 10 streaks that involve both regular season games and games which occurred in the postseason.

Series streaks

Regular season - single opponent
The longest winning streak against a single opponent is 23 games by the Orioles over the Royals from May 10, 1969 - August 2, 1970.

Baltimore had won more than 90 games in three of the previous four seasons, with a World Series title in 1966. The Royals were an expansion team in their first season. Kansas City won the first meeting on May 9, 1969, but Baltimore took the final 11 that season and swept all 12 in 1970 before the Royals finally took a walk-off win in their first confrontation of 1971.

Postseason
This list contains only the top 10 streaks consisting entirely of postseason series. For the purpose of this list, one-game wild card matchups, such as the 2012 Cardinals' win, are counted.

See also
List of Major League Baseball longest losing streaks
1869-1870 Cincinnati Red Stockings, an 84-game winning streak including a 65-game perfect season.
Moneyball, 2011 film based on the 2003 book.

References

Inline citations

General references
Baseball-Reference.com – Team Winning and Losing Streaks Analyzer
MLB.com – Longest winning streaks:A breakdown of the longest winning streaks in the history of every club

Streaks